Martina Hingis and Anna Kournikova were the defending champions, but none of them competed this year.

Lisa Raymond and Rennae Stubbs won the title by defeating Arantxa Sánchez Vicario and Magüi Serna 6–3, 4–6, 6–2 in the final. It was the 16th title for Raymond and the 22nd title for Stubbs in their respective doubles careers. It was also the 2nd title for the pair during the season, after their win in the Australian Open.

Seeds
The first four seeds received a bye into the second round.

Draw

Finals

Top half

Bottom half

References
 Official Results Archive (ITF)
 Official Results Archive (WTA)

Italian Open - Doubles
Women's Doubles